The twelfth season of the German-version of the reality show I'm a Celebrity...Get Me Out of Here! began on 19 January 2018 and is scheduled to be broadcast until 3 February 2018 on RTL Television.

Sonja Zietlow and Daniel Hartwich are the hosts as in the years 2013 to 2017. Also the paramedic Bob McCarron alias "Dr. Bob "is back.

Contestants

Results and elimination
 Indicates that the celebrity received the most votes from the public
 Indicates that the celebrity received the fewest votes and was eliminated immediately (no bottom two)
 Indicates that the celebrity was in the bottom two of the public vote

On Day 9 and Day 10 none of the celebrities were eliminated because of Giuliana's and Ansgar's exit. On these days the contestant with the fewest votes was announced. The votes were counted for Day 11. After the final the voting stats were not published for these two days.

Bushtucker Trials

 "*": Trials in which only all or no stars could be won

Result table: Who Should go to the Bushtucker Trials?

Statistics

Ratings

References

External links
 

2018 German television seasons
12